Lemnaru, meaning "carpenter", is a Romanian surname that may refer to:

Mădălin Lemnaru (born 1989), Romanian rugby union player
Oscar Lemnaru (1907–1968), Romanian journalist, short story writer and translator
Valentin Lemnaru (born 1984), Romanian footballer

Romanian-language surnames
Occupational surnames